A tone stack is a specialized type of audio filter incorporated into the circuit of an audio amplifier for altering the frequency response of the amplifier.  The term is primarily used in reference to instrument amplifiers such as guitar amplifiers. The simplest tone stacks are derived from a bridged T network implemented with resistors in place of inductors, creating a notch filter. These will utilize 3 capacitors and 3 resistors in the form of potentiometers.
The Fender Bassman was the first amplifier to standardize the tone stack design. Dubbed the 5F6-A, this tone stack offered the performer the ability to control the amplifier's low, mid, and high frequency response independently.

References